The skilling (pronounced shilling in English) was the Scandinavian equivalent of the shilling. It was used as a subdivision of the various kinds of currencies named rigsdaler in use throughout Scandinavia, including the Danish rigsdaler, the Norwegian rigsdaler, and the Swedish riksdaler.

Denmark
The word is still used colloquially for a small but unspecified amount of money ("lille skilling"). King Christian IX abolished the rigsdaler and skilling in favor of the kroner and ører in 1873.

Norway

It was introduced in Norway in the early 16th century and was abolished 1875.

Sweden

It was in use between 1776-1855.

See also

Austrian schilling
Scandinavian Monetary Union

Modern obsolete currencies
Scandinavian history
Early Modern currencies